Safeway may refer to:

Brands and enterprises

Supermarket chains
 Safeway Inc., a grocery company in the United States
 Safeway (Australia), a defunct Australian supermarket chain, which was a subsidiary of the American company and is now part of Woolworths Limited
 Safeway (Canada), a former subsidiary of the American company and now a division of Sobeys
 Safeway (Channel Islands), a defunct Channel Islands supermarket chain, which was a subsidiary of the UK Safeway plc and is now part of Waitrose
 Safeway (UK), a defunct UK supermarket chain, which was a subsidiary of the American company 
 Safeway Stores (Ireland), a former Northern Ireland–based joint venture between the Safeway plc and Fitzwilton Group

Other brands and enterprises
 Safeway Insurance Group, a privately held insurance company in the United States
 Safway Services, now known as BrandSafway, American construction services company

People 
 Safeway Goya, American singer